Richard Kenneth Corkill (born 1951) was the Chief Minister of the Isle of Man, December 2001 to December 2004 and an elected member of the House of Keys from 1991 to 2006. He was born in Douglas, Isle of Man. He was elected by Tynwald with 21 votes, defeating Edgar Quine, who received 10 votes.

Governmental positions
Minister of Home Affairs, 1995-1996
Minister of the Treasury, 1996-2001
Chief Minister, 2001-2004

The Corkill Council

Council changes
In what would have been a mid term shake up, Mr Corkill replaced MLCs Clare Christian and Pamela Crowe who has come under fire as Health and DLGE ministers respectively. Steve Rodan was promoted to Health Minister and Bill Henderson and David Anderson were given their first jobs in the council.

References 

1951 births
Living people
Chief Ministers of the Isle of Man
Members of the House of Keys 1991–1996
Members of the House of Keys 1996–2001
Members of the House of Keys 2001–2006
People from Douglas, Isle of Man
Heads of government who were later imprisoned